The 78th Army Band, United States Army Reserve is a musical organization of the 99th Reserve Support Command.  It was organized on 1 October 2008 as part of the Army Reserve Transformation process and was posted to Ft. Dix, New Jersey.  On 29 June 2018, the 78th Army Band absorbed members of the 319th Army Band after its inactivation leaving an element of Army Music in the ever desirable NYC market.

In addition to its concert, ceremonial and concert bands the 78th Army Band also features a jazz combo, brass quintet, a Dixie-land band and a rock band known as "Checkmate".  Presently the band's members are from Delaware, Maryland, New Jersey, New York, Pennsylvania, Kentucky, and Virginia.

As an Army Reserve band the 78th trains and performs one weekend a month and performs two weeks of active duty each year.

Leadership

Musical performance teams 
The 78th Army Band consists of several small performance ensembles, including:

Contact 
As an Army Reserve band the 78th Army Band offers musicians the opportunity to serve their country through music while securing funding to help them pay for college. The band can be reached by contacting the full-time staff at 609-562-7914.

Social media 
www.facebook.com/78thArmyBand

www.youtube.com/78thArmyBand

www.instagram.com/78thArmyBand

www.twitter.com/78thArmyBand

Public performances
Beyond military ceremonial performances, the 78th Army Band frequently performs community relations performances. These performances often include high school and community concerts, parades and other such performances as requested by members of the community at large.

A list of the band's public performance is available from Army Bands Online

Notable performances
 U.S. Army War College Commencement, Carlisle Barracks, Pennsylvania, Annual Performance 
 Tour in Germany, 1992
 U.S. Capitol, Washington, D.C., 1992
 U.S. National Memorial Day Parade, Washington, D.C., 2008 
 National Boy Scout Jamboree, Fort A.P. Hill, Virginia, 2010 
 Presidential visit to Joint Base McGuire-Dix-Lakehurst, 2014

Lineage and honors 
Lineage and honors information correct as of 20 March 2009

 Constituted 2 August 1943 in the Organized Reserves as the Band, 78th Infantry Division
 Activated 9 August 1943 at Camp Butner, North Carolina
 Redesignated 1 December 1943 as the 78th Infantry Division Band
 Inactivated 22 May 1946 in Germany
(Organized Reserves redesignated 25 March 1948 as the Organized Reserve Corps; redesignated 9 July 1952 as the Army Reserve
 Activated 1 October 1950 at Newark, New Jersey
 Location changed 9 November 1955 to Kearny, New Jersey; on 6 December 1958 to Edison, New Jersey
 Reorganized and redesignated 1 May 1959 as the 78th Division Band
 Consolidated 31 January 1968 with the Support Company, 78th Division (Training) and consolidated unit reorganized and redesignated as the Support Company and Band, 78th Division (Training)
 Reorganized and redesignated 1 September 1970 as Headquarters and Headquarters Company and Band, 78th Support Battalion, an element of the 78th Division (Training)
 Reorganized and redesignated 1 August 1971 as Headquarters and Headquarters Detachment and Band, 78th Support Battalion, an element of the 78th Division (Training)
 Band element withdrawn 16 November 1982 and redesignated as the 878th Army Band, an element of the 78th Division (Training) (Headquarters and Headquarters Detachment, 78th Support Battalion—hereafter separate lineage)
 Reorganized and redesignated 17 September 1983 as the band element of Headquarters Company, 78th Division (Training)
 Band element withdrawn 16 September 1988 from Headquarters Company, 78th Division (Training); concurrently reorganized and redesignated as the 78th Division Band

(78th Division [Training] reorganized and redesignated 1 October 1993 as the 78th Division [Exercise]; on 17 October 1999 as the 78th Division [Training Support])
 Relieved 1 April 2007 from assignment to the 78th Division (Training Support)
 Reorganized and redesignated 16 October 2008 as the 78th Army Band; concurrently location changed to Fort Dix, New Jersey

The current 78th Army Band also incorporates several previous Army bands:
 19th Army Band, Fort Dix, NJ
 307th Army Band, Norristown, PA
 78th Infantry Division Band, Edison, NJ
 276th Pennsylvania Guard Band, Philadelphia, PA

78th Army Band HonorsCampaign participation credit World War II: Rhineland; Ardennes-Alsace; Central EuropeDecorations''
 Streamer embroidered EUROPEAN THEATER
 Meritorious Unit Commendation (Army)

Heraldric devices 
The 78th Army Band has its own collection of heraldric devices, including a baldric, mace, tabard, drum design and unit tab for wear on the uniform.

References

External links 
 United States Army Reserve
 U.S. Army Bands
 99th RSC Photo Gallery

078